Splash Entertainment, LLC., formerly known as Mike Young Productions, Inc., MoonScoop Entertainment, LLC. and Taffy Entertainment, is an American animation studio that produces children's TV series. Splash also controls the streaming service Kabillion.

History
The studio was originally owned and operated by three animation producers, husband and wife Mike and Liz Young, and Bill Schultz (6 seasons of The Simpsons, Garfield and Friends, Bobby's World). The studio makes both traditional 2D and 3D computer animation. Mike Young Productions became a fully owned subsidiary of MoonScoop Group in 2006, with Mike Young becoming COO US Producer of MoonScoop Group in 2009.

MoonScoop Entertainment, LLC.'s parent company, the MoonScoop Group, entered administration in Paris courts in July 2013, but this did not affect the operations of the US company. Ellipsanime (through Jokebox), purchased MoonScoop France's 51% ownership in MoonScoop Entertainment, LLC.

MoonScoop Entertainment, LLC. renamed itself Splash Entertainment, LLC. with the purchasing of the controlling interest by Mike and Liz Young on February 3, 2014.

On June 13, 2022, Splash Entertainment announced they would form a joint-venture with French studio Cyber Group Studios called CyberSplash Entertainment.

Productions

Television series
The Prince of Atlantis (co-production with BBC and Ravensburger Film & TV, 1997)
Starhill Ponies (with S4C, Bumper Films, and the BBC, 1998)
Voltron: The Third Dimension (1998)
Clifford the Big Red Dog (2000-2003, animation only)
Butt-Ugly Martians (2001)
Horrible Histories (2001)
Funky Cops (2002-2004)
He-Man and the Masters of the Universe (2002) (remake)
Clifford's Puppy Days (2003-2006, animation only)
Code Lyoko (2003-2007, 2D and 3D animation)
Dive Olly Dive! (2005-2010)
Bratz (2005-2008)
Fantastic Four: World's Greatest Heroes (2006-2007)
Cosmic Quantum Ray (2006-2007)
SamSam (2007-2011)
Chloe's Closet (2009-2013)
Geronimo Stilton (2009-2017)
Tara Duncan (2010-2011; canceled)
The DaVincibles (2011)
Care Bears: Welcome to Care-a-Lot (2012, Animation only)
Code Lyoko: Evolution (2013, live-action and 3D animation)
Sabrina: Secrets of a Teenage Witch (2014; canceled)
Care Bears and Cousins (2015-2016, Animation only)
Woody Woodpecker (2018) (web series)
Gasp!
Growing Up Creepie
Hero: 108
The Hot Rod Dogs and Cool Car Cats (with Dave Edwards Studio and Scottish Television, 1995)
I Got a Rocket
Jakers! The Adventures of Piggley Winks
Kulipari: An Army of Frogs
Kulipari: Dream Walker
Lalaloopsy
Mix Master
My Phone Genie
Peep and the Big Wide World
Pet Alien
Catscratch
Frankenstein's Cat
Strawberry Shortcake's Berry Bitty Adventures
Super Sportlets
The Big Knights 
ToddWorld
The Twisted Whiskers Show
We're Lalaloopsy
Wild Grinders
Zevo-3

Feature films and specials
Mama, Do You Love Me (1999)
Creepshow 3
Quest for Zhu
Bratz
Bratz: Rock Angelz (2005)
Bratz Genie Magic (2006)
Bratz: Passion 4 Fashion Diamondz (2006)
Bratz Fashion Pixiez (2007)
Bratz: Girlz Really Rock (2008)
Bratz: Desert Jewelz (2012)
Bratz Super Babyz (2007)
Bratz Kidz Fairy Tales (2008)
Dive Olly Dive and the Pirate Treasure
Dive Olly Dive and the Octopus Rescue
Dive Olly Dive: A Hero's Magical Quest
Dive Olly Dive: Deep Sea Adventure
Dive Olly Dive: Alien Encounter
Journey to GloE
Michael Jackson's Halloween (TV special)
Norm of the North:
Norm of the North (theatrical feature)
Norm of the North: Keys to the Kingdom
Norm of the North: King Sized Adventure
Norm of the North: Family Vacation
P. J. Sparkles (1992)
Polly Pocket: Lunar Eclipse 
Mariah Carey's All I Want for Christmas Is You
Alpha and Omega: Dino Digs
Alpha and Omega: The Big Fureeze
Alpha and Omega: Journey to Bear Kingdom
Rock Dog 2: Rock Around the Park
Rock Dog 3: Battle the Beat
The Life & Adventures of Santa Claus

Taffy Entertainment

Taffy Entertainment was founded in 2004 to help Mike Young Productions to distribute their animated programs worldwide and to improve brand management.
In March 2009, MYP sold their 51% in the company to MoonScoop Group and is now known as MoonScoop, LLC.

In 2009, Taffy Entertainment took on the MoonScoop name and it continues to represent the company's brands worldwide, in addition to third-party properties from some of the largest producers worldwide.

Taffy Entertainment represents brands from animation producers, including Mike Young Productions, its French parent company, MoonScoop Group, and some programs from third party producers. Taffy's library for distribution includes such programs as “ToddWorld,” “Pet Alien,” “Titeuf”, “Growing Up Creepie,” “Mix Master,” “Fantastic Four,” “Bobby's World” and “Code Lyoko”. The full library includes over 1500 hours of animation.

Taffy now handles the distribution for the animated series based on the book series Geronimo Stilton.

Awards
Distributor of the Year for 2007
Nominated for a second year in 2008

References

External links
Official website
Mike Young Productions at Internet Movie Database

American animation studios
British animation studios
Television production companies of the United States
Television production companies of the United Kingdom
Mass media companies established in 1990
1990 establishments in the United States
1990 establishments in the United Kingdom
2014 mergers and acquisitions
2022 mergers and acquisitions